Rafael Axpe (born February 23, 1954) is a Spanish sport shooter. He competed at the Summer Olympics in 1988 and 1992. In 1988, he placed 11th in the mixed trap event, while in 1992, he tied for 33rd place in the mixed trap event.

References

1954 births
Living people
Trap and double trap shooters
Spanish male sport shooters
Shooters at the 1988 Summer Olympics
Shooters at the 1992 Summer Olympics
Olympic shooters of Spain
20th-century Spanish people